Markus Hammerer (born 31 August 1989) is an Austrian footballer.

References

Austrian footballers
Austrian Football Bundesliga players
SV Ried players
LASK players
1989 births
Living people
Association football forwards
People from Braunau am Inn
Footballers from Upper Austria